Autry Raymond Erickson (January 25, 1938 – August 21, 2010) was a professional ice hockey player who played 226 games in the National Hockey League. He played with the Chicago Black Hawks, Boston Bruins, Toronto Maple Leafs, and Oakland Seals. He won the Stanley Cup in 1967 with the Toronto Maple Leafs, playing no regular season games, and only three playoff games.

Aut Erickson wore number 11 when he joined the Boston Bruins in 1959-60. The lanky young rearguard, known as a steady, dependable blueliner, would play two full seasons in Boston, establishing his rock solid, robust and rugged minded defensive presence. In May 1965, the Detroit Red Wings traded Erickson, Larry Jeffrey, Marcel Pronovost, Ed Joyal, and Lowell MacDonald to the Toronto Maple Leafs for Andy Bathgate, Billy Harris, and Gary Jarrett. Erickson played in the 1967 Stanley Cup Finals while with the Maple Leafs. Erickson was an original member of the expansion Oakland Seals.

Erickson died in August 2010 after a long battle with cancer.

Career statistics

Regular season and playoffs

References

External links

1938 births
2010 deaths
Boston Bruins players
Buffalo Bisons (AHL) players
Calgary Stampeders (WHL) players
Canadian ice hockey defencemen
Canadian people of Swedish descent
Chicago Blackhawks players
Deaths from cancer in California
Ice hockey people from Alberta
Oakland Seals players
Phoenix Roadrunners (WHL) players
Pittsburgh Hornets players
Saskatoon Quakers players
Saskatoon Regals/St. Paul Saints players
Sportspeople from Lethbridge
Stanley Cup champions
Toronto Maple Leafs players
Victoria Maple Leafs players